The Serpukhovsko-Timiryazevskaya line (Line 9), sometimes colloquially referred to as Grey Line, is a line of the Moscow Metro. Originally opened in 1983, it was extended throughout the 1980s and early 90s and again in the early 2000s. With its current length of 41.2 km, it among the longest lines of the Moscow Metro (all underground making it the world's 8th longest rapid transit tunnel). There are 25 stations on the line.

History
The project of a north-south diameter was finalised in the 1971 Moscow General Development Plan, and construction began in the mid-1970s. The first stage, the southern Serpukhovsky radius, was opened in 1983 which brought the Metro to the southern districts of Danilovsky, Nagorny, Ziuzino and Chertanovo. Starting at Serpukhovskaya square the radius follows the Varshavskoye avenue, twice contacts the Moscow–Pavelets line, afterwards it deviates slightly westwards passing Azovskaya street, where it meets the then terminus of the Gorkovsko–Zamoskvoretskaya line, Kakhovskaya station. Afterwards, the line crosses back across northern Chertanovo's main intersection (Balaklavsky avenue and Sevastopolsky Bulvar).

Some of the new technical methods employed in the construction of this section included passing from deep alignment to shallow in water-carrying soils. A new technique of contour freezing was applied, which then used explosives to bore through the unstable region. The stretch between Serpukhovskaya and Tulskaya was further made difficult due gasoline leaks from an above petrol station over the years sufficiently absorbed by the soil such that the high concentration of fumes caused a fire in the unfinished tunnel, this introduced a new practice of adding additional boreholes in areas of difficult ventilation.

In November 1985 the line had its first extension southwards to Prazhskaya. This station was designed by Czechoslovak engineers and specialists from the Prague Metro. Simultaneously the station Moskevská was built in Prague by Soviet engineers.

Beginning in the mid-1980s work started on extending the system northwards through the city centre. This very deep section passed the areas of Yakimanka and Arbat where the first in Moscow 4 station transfer was set up in 1986. In 1987 this was followed by the station Chekhovskaya located near the Pushkin Square. In 1988 the final extension through the centre first deviated eastwards to include Tsvetnoy Boulevard and then crossed the ring at Novoslobodskaya before continuing northwards to Savyolovsky Rail Terminal.

Afterwards, construction of the Timiryazevsky radius followed and in 1991 the major five station extension brought the line to the northern districts of Timiryazvesky, Butyrsky, Marfino and Otradnoye itself. Also, the line had interchanges with three major railway lines. The unique station Timiryazveskaya is the only one in Moscow built to the Deep single-vault (Leningrad) design.  The Timiryazevsky radius had two more extensions, Biberevo in 1992 and Altufyevo in 1994 making it the northernmost in the system.

On the opposite Serpukhovsky end, in the early 2000s three extensions were built: Ulitsa Akademika Yangelya (2000), Annino (2001) and Bulvar Dmitriya Donskogo (2002). The latter carried the line into Severnoye Butovo District, making it the first line to cross the MKAD beltway. Today the line is the only one in Moscow for which no extension plans or proposals exist.

Timeline

Stations

Rolling stock
The line is served by the Varshavskoe (№ 8) and Vladykino (№ 14) depots. In 2005 it began a slow transition to eight carriage trains. As of November 2005, Vladykino completed its transition and presently has 43 eight-carriage trains assigned to them. Varshavskoe began later and completed its transition in March 2006 with 38 eight-carriage trains. The line received new 81-714/717 trains upon its opening in 1983. Due to its recent extensions various trains were added to its ever-growing stock, some surplus from other depots, others factory fresh 81-714.5/717.5 and 81-714.5M/717.5M.

Starting 2012, the line began receiving new 81-760/761 trains. 81-717/714 trains have been completely withdrawn and scrapped, 81-717.5/714.5 and 81-717.5M/714.5M were transferred to other lines where additional trains were needed. In November 2013, the Varshavskoe depot was fully upgraded to new trains, there were only a few old 81-717/714 carriages, which formed about three trains. Vladykino, as of November 2013, only had two new trains, but additional 81-760/761s came from the Varshavskoe depot in December 2013.

Subway car types used on the line over the years:

-Series 81-717: 1983 - March 2015

-Series 81-717.5: 1994 - March 2015

-Series 81-717.5M: 2003 - March 2015

-Series 81-760/761: 26th of December 2012 - present

Recent events and future plans
Second exits at Petrovsko-Razumovskaya, Savyolovskaya and Timiryazevskaya stations are planned. However, in terms of extensions, the line is considered to be complete. Although there is some need of connection to the south border parts of Moscow, it was decided that Butovskaya Light Metro Line will fulfil this need.

References

External links

Serpukhovsko-Timiryazevskaya line photos & info on the Robert Schwandl's UrbanRail site
Serpukhovsko-Timiryazevskaya line gallery on the Urban Electric Transit

Moscow Metro lines
Railway lines opened in 1983